The Northern Illinois Huskies wrestling team represents Northern Illinois University (NIU) in DeKalb, Illinois. NIU wrestling started competing in 1931 and currently competes in the Mid-American Conference (MAC). NIU wrestling has produced two NCAA Champions, three NAIA Champions, and currently holds a 51-year streak (1972–present) of sending at least one NCAA qualifier to the NCAA Division I Wrestling Championships. The Huskies are coached by Ryan Ludwig.

Championships

Conference Championships
 1985 – Mid-American Conference (MAC) Championship.

Individual NCAA National Champions

Individual NAIA National Champions

Individual Conference Champions

NCAA Wrestling Championships qualifiers 
NIU has sent 123 wrestlers to the NCAA Division I Wrestling Championships, including a current 51-year streak of sending at least one qualifier.

All-Americans 
NIU wrestling has had 16 All-Americans in program history.

Coaching staff
NIU wrestling head coach Ryan Ludwig, who took over the position starting in the 2011–12 season, is a three-time NAIA All-American and a national finalist at 157 pounds.

Ryan Ludwig – Head Coach
Dominick Moyer – Assistant Coach
Ty Prazma – Assistant Coach

See also
National Wrestling Hall of Fame and Museum

References

External links